The Central District of Anar County is a district (bakhsh) in Anar County, Kerman Province, Iran. At the 2006 census, its population was 31,554, in 7,803 families.  The district has two cities: Anar and Aminshahr. The district has two rural districts (dehestan): Bayaz Rural District and Hoseynabad Rural District.

References 

Anar County
Districts of Kerman Province